The Mercedes-Benz W 142 (Mercedes-Benz Typ 320) was a six-cylinder passenger car launched in February 1937, as a successor to the Mercedes-Benz Typ 290 (Mercedes-Benz W 18). The car was known by its name Typ 320 at the time of its production and service, but is in retrospect commonly referred to using its Mercedes-Benz works number, "W142", which gives a more unambiguously unique nomenclature.

Mercedes-Benz Typ 320 n (Works number W142/I)  1937–1938 
The standard-wheelbase version of the W142 shared its  wheelbase with the standard lengthened versions of its predecessor, but a more streamlined form with longer overhangs meant that even in this form the W142 was substantially longer and indeed wider than the earlier car. The front grill was gently raked backwards, and there was no longer a bar in front of it to carry lights, all of which gave the car a more sporting look than the model it replaced.

This was delivered to the rear wheels via a four-speed manual transmission which, unusually in the 1930s, incorporated synchromesh on all four ratios. The footbrake used a hydraulic control mechanism and operated on all four wheels. The suspension set-up was carried over from the W18 with a swing axle at the rear and the front axle suspended with a central transverse leaf spring and coil springs beside the wheels.

Customers wishing to make their own arrangements in respect of bodywork could buy a standard-wheelbase W142 in base chassis form at the manufacturer's listed price of 6,500 Marks. Otherwise the choice of standard bodies was restricted to a three-seat cabriolet (known as the "Cabriolet A") or a coupé-bodied equivalent with a removable roof, priced respectively at 11,800 Marks or 12,300 Marks.

Mercedes-Benz Typ 320 (Works number W142/II)  1937–1938 
Longer-bodied cars came with an extra  of wheelbase, and Mercedes-Benz offered a choice from a wide range of standard body options for the longer cars.

Customers happy to make their own arrangements in respect of bodywork could buy a longer-wheelbase W142 in base chassis form at the manufacturer's listed price of 6,800 Marks, or 300 Marks more than the price of the shorter chassis. The entry level model with a Mercedes-Benz body included in the price was the four-door ”Limousine” (sedan/saloon) at 8,950 Marks. There were no fewer than four cabriolet-bodied versions of the longer-wheelbase car offered, being a two-door 2/3-seater ("Cabriolet A"), a two-door 4-seater with four side-windows ("Cabriolet B"), a four-door 4-seater ("Cabriolet D") and a very substantial-looking four-door 6-seater with three rows of seats ("Pullman-Cabriolet F"). Other soft-topped standard-bodied versions were a Torpedo-bodied 6-seater "Tourenwagen" and a sporty 2-seater Roadster. There was also a six-seater “Pullman-Limousine” with three rows of seats and six side windows under a conventional steel roof. The highest listed price for a Mercedes-Benz-bodied W142 was 14,500 Marks for a "Stromlinien-Limousine" featuring a strikingly modern exceptionally streamlined steel body.

Mercedes-Benz Typ 320 (Works number W142/III)  1937–1939 
The short-wheelbase version of the car was also the basis for a "Wehrmachtskübelwagen" (military vehicle), one of several such vehicles which may have provided inspiration for the subsequent (1941) Jeep. The W142 “Kübelwagen” retained the frontal style of the car on which it was based, but with a horizontal bar ahead of the front grill on which to mount lights. It had four front-hinged doors, a canvas top and wide-tread tyres for rough terrain. In this form the vehicle came with a listed top speed of 118 km/h (73 mph).

Mercedes-Benz Typ 320 (Works number W142/IV)  1938–1942 
Nevertheless, the cars retained the "Typ 320" designation. Instead the compression ratio was lowered in anticipation of future shortages enforcing the use of fuel synthesized from coal which was expected to have a lower octane rating than the “normal” fuel used at the time. The larger-engined car also came with an overdrive ratio (1 : 0.73) added to the hitherto four-speed gear box which the car had featured since launch.

Commercial
Between 1937 and 1942 Mercedes-Benz produced 4,326 of the 3,208 cc cars and 885 of the 3,405 cc cars.

Production of a further 1,806 W142 based military Kübelwagen between 1938 and 1940 is also recorded.

See also

Notes

References
 

This entry incorporates information from the equivalent German Wikipedia entry.

External links
 

W142
W142
Rear-wheel-drive vehicles
Sedans
1930s cars